Stanley Gordon "Bud" Kemp (March 2, 1924 – August 15, 1999) was a Canadian professional ice hockey defenceman who played in one game in the National Hockey League for the Toronto Maple Leafs during the 1948–49 season, on January 23, 1949 against the Detroit Red Wings. The rest of his career, which lasted from 1943 to 1957, was mainly spent in the American Hockey League and senior Ontario Hockey Association.

Career statistics

Regular season and playoffs

See also
 List of players who played only one game in the NHL

External links
 

1924 births
1999 deaths
Canadian ice hockey defencemen
Ice hockey people from Ontario
Ontario Hockey Association Senior A League (1890–1979) players
Pittsburgh Hornets players
Providence Reds players
Sportspeople from Hamilton, Ontario
Toronto Maple Leafs players